"The Boldness Of Style EP" is the first single from  the American rock band Thelonious Monster's second studio album, Next Saturday Afternoon. The single was officially released in 1987.

Origins
Flea of the Red Hot Chili Peppers produced the lead track "Walk On Water". "If I" was produced by John Girdletr and Bucket Fisher, a five-month-old baby who was at every session for the song, and every time he cried the band did another take. Shalome produced the live version of "Listen To The Music", which was originally written by The Doobie Brothers."Listen To The Music" was recorded live at Berkeley Square in Berkeley, California.

"If I" featured Fishbone's Angelo Moore (saxophone), John Norwood Fisher (bass) and Christopher Dowd (organ). Other guest musicians that appear on this EP are: "Walk On Water": John Dentino (organ) and Tree (saxophone), "If I": Connie Berunen (percussion) Sondra Christianson (piano) and Sabrina Judge (vocals)

Track listing
US 3-track 12" vinyl EP 88561-154-1
"Walk on Water" - 2:15
"If I" - 4:29
"Listen to the Music (Live)" - 2:08

1987 EPs
Thelonious Monster albums